The State Treasurer of Wisconsin is a constitutional officer in the executive branch of the government of the U.S. state of Wisconsin. Thirty-six individuals have held the office of State Treasurer since statehood. The incumbent is John Leiber, a Republican.

Election and term of office 
The State Treasurer is elected on Election Day in November, and takes office on the first Monday of the next January. There is no limit to the number of terms a State Treasurer may hold. From 1848 to 1968, the State Treasurer was elected to a two-year term in the November general election. Since 1970, following ratification of a constitutional amendment in April 1967, the State Treasurer has been elected to a four-year term.

In the event of a vacancy in the office of the State Treasurer, the Governor may appoint a replacement to fill the remainder of the term. The State Treasurer may be removed from office through an impeachment trial.

Powers and duties 
In Wisconsin, the State Treasurer is the chief banker of state government, signing checks, share drafts, and other drafts drawn on state funds and disbursed by the Department of Administration; this role extends to the State Investment Fund and the Public Employee Trust Fund, which are managed by independent state agencies. The State Treasurer also makes certified copies of deeds, bonds, and other documents filed with his or her office and promotes Wisconsin's unclaimed property program. Furthermore, the State Treasurer assists in the administration of the County Mining Investment Fund and receives and deposits payments for certain Great Lakes fisheries-related surcharges into the Conservation Fund. Occasional functions performed by the State Treasurer include approving the amounts and sureties filed with the Department of Administration in connection to the Department of Revenue's receipt of paid income and franchise taxes, receiving payments from the Banking Division in connection with liquidation proceedings of banks, acknowledging the satisfaction and discharge of certain mortgages involving the state, and conducting training conferences for municipal clerks and treasurers.

Aside from the office's functional responsibilities, the State Treasurer is a member of the Board of Directors of the Insurance Security Fund and of the Board of Commissioners of Public Lands.

Reduction of powers and office dissolution attempts 
Since the 1990s, most duties vested in the State Treasurer's office have gradually been eliminated or transferred to other state agencies. 1995 Wisconsin Act 27 eliminated the office's securities section, which had the responsibility of safekeeping securities purchased by the State of Wisconsin Investment Board. 1997 Wisconsin Act 27 transferred the Division of Trust Lands and Investment to the Wisconsin Department of Administration. Most notably, 2003 Wisconsin Act 33 transferred the cash and debt management functions of the State Treasurer's office to the Department of Administration. Moreover, 2011 Wisconsin Act 32 transferred the state's version of a 529 plan, known as EdVest, to the Department of Administration. The same act also transferred the Local Government Investment Pool and corresponding management services functions to the Department of Administration. Later, 2013 Wisconsin Act 20 transferred the State Treasurer's Unclaimed Property Program to the Wisconsin Department of Revenue. As a result of these interagency transfers, the office of State Treasurer in Wisconsin is institutionally the weakest directly elected member of the National Association of State Treasurers, according to state-by-state analyses published by the Council of State Governments, and the only state treasurer nationwide not responsible for cash management.

On October 27, 2015, the Wisconsin State Assembly approved an amendment to the Wisconsin Constitution to abolish the State Treasurer's office, Assembly Joint Resolution 5 (AJR 5), with 63 "yea" votes and 33 "nay" votes. The Wisconsin State Senate approved AJR 5 on January 20, 2016. The first approval of the amendment was enrolled on March 15, 2016. Because this measure was approved by both chambers of the Wisconsin State Legislature, the Wisconsin Elimination of State Treasurer Amendment was placed on the 2018 spring general election ballot on April 3, 2018. The referendum was defeated, with 62% of voters statewide choosing to retain the office with a "no" vote against amending the constitution to eliminate the office.

List of state treasurers 

This is a list of state treasurers of Wisconsin.

Notes

See also
Wisconsin Board of Commissioners of Public Lands

References

External links 
Wisconsin Board of Commissioners of Public Lands
Wisconsin Insurance Security Fund

Lists of Wisconsin politicians
State treasurers of Wisconsin